Alim Öztürk (born 17 November 1992) is a professional footballer who plays as a centre-back for Samsunspor. Born in the Netherlands, he is a youth international for Turkey.

Öztürk has previously played for Dutch club SC Cambuur, Trabzonspor, 1461 Trabzon, Scottish club Heart of Midlothian, Boluspor and Sunderland.

Career

Playing in Netherlands
Born in Alkmaar, Netherlands, to his Turkish parents, Öztürk grew up with three siblings and started playing football when he was nine years old and joining AFC '34 youth team. His parents kept distance from Öztürk playing football. He then joined FC Groningen. In 2011, Öztürk joined Eerste Divisie side SC Cambuur, where he quickly went through to the first team and made his Eerste Divisie debut for Cambuur on 22 January 2012.

Playing in Turkey
He moved to Turkish club Trabzonspor in 2013 for €125,000  on a three year contract, depending on the ongoing payment, but did not break into their first team.

After struggling to break into the first team, Öztürk was sent to join 1461 Trabzon on loan for the 2013–14 season. After a half season with the club, Öztürk left Trabzonspor by mutual consent. Öztürk later described playing in Turkey as difficult, citing more long balls, more fights and unsatisfied playing in the second division.

Heart of Midlothian
Öztürk moved to then Scottish Championship side Hearts in June 2014 on a three year contract. Öztürk made his Hearts debut, playing in the centre-back along with Danny Wilson, in a 2–1 win over Rangers in the opening game of the season. On 26 October 2014, Öztürk scored his first goal for the club, a 40-yard screamer against Edinburgh rivals Hibernian. He also scored with long-range efforts against Raith Rovers, Cowdenbeath, and he scored a free-kick against Queen of the South. Alim Öztürk was the main free-kick taker at Hearts. With 33 appearances and scoring four times in his first season at Hearts, Öztürk was among six players to be named 2014–15 Championship's Team of the Year. Öztürk was also won Goal of the Season and Memorable Moment at the club's award ceremony.

Following the club's promotion to the Scottish Premiership and Wilson's departure, it was announced that Öztürk was appointed as the new captain at Hearts. He had previously spoke out of becoming the club's captain ahead of the 2015–16 season. Öztürk's first game as Hearts' captain came in the opening game of the season, in a 4–3 win over St Johnstone.  On 21 September 2016, the captaincy was transferred to Perry Kitchen.

Boluspor
Öztürk returned to Turkish football in January 2017, signing an 18-month contract with TFF First League club Boluspor.

Sunderland
On 21 June 2018, EFL League One club Sunderland announced the signing of Öztürk on a free transfer with a two-year contract.

Ozturk struggled to cement his place in the team and it was announced on 17 June 2020 that he would be leaving Sunderland, bringing to an end his two years at the club.

Ümraniyespor
On 26 August 2020, Öztürk joined TFF First League club Ümraniyespor.

Personal life
Öztürk speaks Dutch, Turkish and English. Öztürk was so popular with Hearts supporters that they named a beer after him.

References

External links

1992 births
Sportspeople from Alkmaar
Footballers from North Holland
Dutch people of Turkish descent
Living people
Dutch footballers
Turkish footballers
Turkey under-21 international footballers
Association football central defenders
AFC '34 players
SC Cambuur players
Trabzonspor footballers
1461 Trabzon footballers
Heart of Midlothian F.C. players
Boluspor footballers
Sunderland A.F.C. players
Ümraniyespor footballers
Samsunspor footballers
Eerste Divisie players
TFF First League players
Scottish Professional Football League players
Scottish Premier League players
English Football League players
Expatriate footballers in Scotland
Turkish expatriate sportspeople in Scotland
Expatriate footballers in England
Turkish expatriate sportspeople in England